The 1984 FIA Formula One World Championship was the 38th season of Fédération Internationale de l'Automobile (FIA) Formula One motor racing. Drivers and teams competed in sixteen Grands Prix for the World Drivers' and World Constructors' championship titles. The season ran from 5 March to 21 October.

In the Drivers' Championship, the season became a duel between McLaren drivers Alain Prost and Niki Lauda. Prost won seven races to Lauda's five, including the last two races of the season, but Lauda eventually prevailed by half a point – the smallest margin in Formula One history. It was Lauda's third title and his first since . McLaren comfortably won the Manufacturers' Championship, their first since .

To date, this is the last championship for an Austrian Formula One driver. It was the second time (after Denny Hulme had done likewise 1967) and to date, last time in World Championship history that the eventual champion did not score a pole position during the entire season.

Drivers and constructors

Team and driver changes

Italian brothers Teo and Corrado Fabi replaced Riccardo Patrese and shared the #2 seat, allowing older brother Teo to honour commitments in the US-based CART World Series. Rumour had both John Watson and young Brazilian Roberto Moreno in the second Brabham seat (Watson himself later confirmed he was close to signing), but the team's main sponsor, Italian dairy company Parmalat, insisted on an Italian driver instead. Piquet and the Fabi brothers drove the Gordon Murray-designed BT53.
 Tyrrell had an all-new driver line up. Michele Alboreto and Danny Sullivan were replaced by F1 rookies Martin Brundle and West German sports car driver Stefan Bellof. Tyrrell were the only team to run the full season with the naturally aspirated, Cosworth DFY V8 engine. Brundle and Bellof would drive the Maurice Philippe-designed 012.
 Williams retained their 1983 line up of  World Champion Keke Rosberg, and veteran Jacques Laffite. Williams also had exclusive use of the  Honda V6 turbo engine for the entire season after having only run it in the last race of 1983 in South Africa. The Honda turbo would power the Patrick Head and Neil Oatley-designed FW09.
 McLaren had exclusive use of the  TAG-Porsche turbo engine that had debuted in the Netherlands the previous year. Frenchman Alain Prost, who had finished second in the 1983 Drivers' Championship, re-joined the team after being sacked from the factory Renault team, replacing John Watson. Prost joined double World Champion Niki Lauda to drive the John Barnard-designed MP4/2. While the TAG engine was the least powerful of the main contenders, its fuel economy and the superior aerodynamics of Barnard's MP4/2, especially at high speed, as well as the driving and car set up skills of Lauda and Prost, compensated for the lack of power.
 Lotus had turbocharged Renault engines and retained their 1983 driver line up of Elio de Angelis and Nigel Mansell. Both drivers would have the all-new Lotus 95T designed by former Renault chief designer Gérard Ducarouge.
 After a 1983 season which saw the factory Renault team lose its way at the end of the year, costing Alain Prost the Drivers' Championship and the team the Constructors' Championship, the major changes to the national French team was its drivers as well as the loss of designer Ducarouge. Prost and American Eddie Cheever were replaced with Frenchman Patrick Tambay (formerly of Ferrari) and Englishman Derek Warwick (formerly of Toleman). The all new RE50 was designed by Michel Tétu and Bernard Dudot and was powered by the  EF4 V6 turbo engine.
 Toleman, who were an up-and-coming team in Formula One, lost Warwick to Renault and released Bruno Giacomelli, but signed former Grand Prix motorcycle World Champion in the 350 and 750 classes, Venezuelan Johnny Cecotto (only the second Venezuelan driver in F1 history), as well Brazilian Ayrton Senna, the reigning British Formula 3 Champion. The team continued to use the turbocharged, 4-cylinder Hart 415T engine for the 1984 season to power their 1983 car, the TG183B, and their new car which appeared for the first time in France, the TG184 designed by Rory Byrne and Pat Symonds. Toleman started the year using Pirelli tyres, but a dispute with the Italian supplier at San Marino saw the team switch to using Michelins for the remainder of the season.
 Euro Racing continued to run the factory-backed Alfa Romeo team, but they lost major sponsor Marlboro. Replacing the red and white colours of the cigarette giant was the green and red of Italian clothes manufacturer Benetton. Also gone were drivers Andrea de Cesaris and Mauro Baldi, replaced by Riccardo Patrese and Eddie Cheever. The team continued to use the fuel-hungry, and moderately powerful 890T V8 turbocharged engine for the season. If not for the engine's poor fuel economy, Patrese and Cheever might have scored more points, as both drivers often retired within laps of race finishes while in point scoring positions simply because they ran out of fuel. Alfa used the Mario Tollentino and Luigi Marmiroli-designed 184T.
 Ferrari introduced the latest version of their successful 126C model, the 126C4 designed by Mauro Forghieri and Harvey Postlethwaite, which was powered by the  Tipo 031 V6 engine. After releasing Patrick Tambay who subsequently signed for Renault, the team signed its first Italian driver since  with Michele Alboreto to join Frenchman René Arnoux, who had finished third in the Drivers' Championship for Ferrari in 1983. It was reported that Enzo Ferrari broke his own rule against signing an Italian driver when he signed Alboreto, making him the first Italian driver at Ferrari since Arturo Merzario. Ferrari were the defending Formula One World Constructors' Champions having won the title in 1983.
 Ligier also joined the ranks of the turbos, dumping the Cosworth V8 in favour of the Renault engine. The V6 turbo powered the Michel Beaujon and Claude Galopin-designed JS23. Drivers were Frenchman François Hesnault, and Italian Andrea de Cesaris.

Season summary

The season had been expected to see a continuation of the Brabham–Renault–Ferrari battle from 1983, with supporting roles for McLaren, Williams and Lotus. McLaren however had stolen a march on its competitors thanks to its TAG turbo engine and the John Barnard-designed MP4/2. The combination of dual World Champion Lauda, nine time Grand Prix winner Prost, the TAG-Porsche and the MP4/2 quickly became the class of the field.

FISA had introduced new fuel economy rules aimed at reducing speeds, ruling that cars powered by turbocharged engines would only have 220 liters of fuel per race, with re-fueling now banned (the tank had to be 220L, but teams were free to try and squeeze more in if they could, which some tried with methods such as freezing the fuel inside the tank). TAG, while still a sponsor with Williams, became a partner with McLaren team boss Ron Dennis, and commissioned German sports car manufacturer Porsche to design and build what would become the TAG-Porsche V6 turbocharged engine. Porsche had extensive experience with similar economy rules due to its participation in endurance racing (which included the 24 Hours of Le Mans) and this translated in superior fuel economy. Coupled with the superior aerodynamics of Barnard's MP4/2 (especially at high speed), this made the McLarens almost unbeatable in races throughout the season.

Reigning World Drivers' Champion Nelson Piquet and his Brabham-BMW were usually the fastest combination on track, which resulted in the Brazilian taking 9 pole positions. However, appalling early season reliability saw the reigning World Drivers' Champion failing to score a point in the first six rounds due to numerous engine and turbo failures, which meant he was never able to challenge consistently.  Despite his back-to-back wins in Canada and Detroit, by halfway through the season it was apparent Piquet would not be able to defend his title, though he continued to fight hard until the end of the season, leading several races before either retiring or being forced to slow when running low on fuel.

The season saw a titanic battle between both McLaren drivers Niki Lauda and Alain Prost. Prost had been sacked by Renault two days after the 1983 season ended for openly criticising the team for failing to develop the RE40 during the season, resulting in the loss of both the Drivers' and Constructors' championships. Fast and ambitious, the Frenchman quickly established his dominance over his teammate, especially in qualifying, though Lauda's race driving saw him often a match for his younger teammate.

He regularly matched the pace of his 1982–1983 McLaren teammate John Watson, but Alain Prost (himself never the absolute fastest in F1) was a different kettle of fish. Lauda quickly realized he could not beat his young teammate on speed, therefore the wily Austrian often ignored qualifying and concentrated on his race strategies. By winning races when Prost ran into trouble and scoring relentlessly when Prost proved quicker, Lauda was able to win the title by just half a point.

Prost though can be considered unlucky not to have won his first World Championship. He won 7 races to Lauda's 5, and lost a potential 4.5 points when the Monaco Grand Prix was stopped early. During the race, Prost had signalled on laps 29 and 31 that the red-flag should be shown, due to the ostensibly dangerous wet-weather conditions. Clerk of Course Jacky Ickx stopped the race after 31 laps, which he also explained was due to the dangerous conditions brought on by constant rain. Prost won the race from the Toleman of Ayrton Senna and the Tyrrell of Stefan Bellof, but only half points were awarded as the race was stopped before half-distance. The decision to stop the race was controversial as Ickx had not consulted with the race stewards before showing the red flag, an action which saw his suspension from being the Clerk of the Course. It was rumoured that Ickx, who at the time the lead driver in the factory backed Rothmans Porsche Sportscar team, had stopped the race when he did so that the Porsche engined McLaren would win and not the Hart engined Toleman of F1 rookie Senna. At the time Senna had been showing what would become legendary wet weather driving skills and was catching the more experienced Prost very quickly. Senna actually passed the slowing Prost as they crossed the line when Ickx held out the red flag (Prost had slowed down having already been told on the team radio that the race had been stopped), but the regulations ruled that the results were taken from the previous lap, where Prost still held a 7.4 second lead. Almost going unnoticed in Senna's late race charge for the lead, was that the Cosworth V8 powered Tyrrell of Bellof (a teammate of Ickx's in the Rothmans Porsche sportscar team) was catching Senna as fast as the Brazilian was catching Prost. Toleman mechanics later confirmed that had the race not been stopped, Senna would not have finished as the TG184 had suffered serious suspension damage due to his constant running over the high curbs at the Nouvelle Chicane.

During the season, the Tyrrell team had its results stripped after a technical infringement. Soon after the podium ceremony for the Detroit Grand Prix in which Martin Brundle had finished in second place (only 2 seconds behind the Brabham of Nelson Piquet), word arrived that the officials had found impurities in the water injection system on his Tyrrell 012 and lead balls in the rubber bag containing the water. Samples of the water were shipped to France and Texas for analysis and found to contain significant levels of hydrocarbons. Team boss Ken Tyrrell was called to a meeting of the FISA Executive Committee on July 18 and, based on the impurities in the water, which had been topped up during a pit stop, was accused of refueling the car during the race. Refueling had been banned prior to the 1984 season and remained illegal until 1994. FISA found the team guilty and Tyrrell was disqualified from the remainder of the World Championship and lost the 13 points they had already gained as of Detroit. They were allowed to and did continue to race, though they did not appear for the final three races of the season. However, they were unable to score any championship points. Many in the paddock felt for Tyrrell as they believed the penalty far outweighed the crime and that FISA boss Jean-Marie Balestre had used the system to make an example of the British-based team to vindicate what happened the previous season, when Brabham escaped punishment after admitting to run a lighter car by using a different blend of fuel.

The team also scored four 1–2 results during the season to easily win the Constructors' Championship with a then-record 143.5 points, some 86 points in front of second-placed Ferrari. McLaren won 12 of the season's 16 races, with Brabham's reigning World Champion Nelson Piquet scoring two wins. Michele Alboreto (Ferrari) and Keke Rosberg (Williams-Honda) were the only other winners in the season with each winning a single race.

For Japanese giant Honda, Rosberg's win in the Dallas Grand Prix in the United States would be the first of 40 wins for their turbocharged V6 engines until the turbos were banned following the  season. It was also Honda's first win in Formula One since John Surtees had won the 1967 Italian Grand Prix at Monza driving the V12 powered Honda RA300 in its debut race. The Dallas Grand Prix was a one-off race, as the race was inexplicably run during the 100F heat of a Texas July summer; the weather and track temperatures were so high that the track broke up very badly. Aside from those problems, the circuit and the organization were well-received, and race was a classic- but only 7 cars finished. This was similar to the previous race in Detroit, where only 6 cars finished. Renowned British motorsports journalist Denis Jenkinson referred to these 2 American races as "demolition derbies".

Zolder held its last Formula One Grand Prix when it hosted the third round Belgian Grand Prix. Fittingly at the track where Ferrari's Gilles Villeneuve had been killed in 1982, Michele Alboreto took pole and won the race carrying Villeneuve's #27 on his car. The Dijon-Prenois circuit also hosted its final Grand Prix when it hosted the French Grand Prix (Rd.5) won by Niki Lauda.

Race by race summary

Round 1: Brazil
Most of the Formula One seasons in the 1980s started at the sweltering tropical heat and humidity of the Jacarepagua Riocentro Autodrome in Rio de Janeiro, Brazil. A 10-day test followed by the Grand Prix often was the case. In addition to a frantic start, drivers had to deal with people running across the track with the cars bearing down on those people; Briton Derek Warwick in the French factory Renault led until an incident with Niki Lauda led to suspension failure; Frenchman Alain Prost won his first Grand Prix with McLaren at the flat and rough but fast Rio circuit. This was also Ayrton Senna's first Formula One race, he was driving for the Toleman team. Senna would prove to be the first retirement of the season when the turbo on his 4 cyl Hart engine failed on lap 8.

Round 2: South Africa
The South African Grand Prix was held traditionally at the fast and flowing Kyalami circuit near the high-altitude city of Johannesburg. During the race morning warm up session, Piercarlo Ghinzani had a massive accident at the fastest corner on the track, the Jukskei sweeping uphill left hander. As a result of the full fuel load in his Osella, a huge fire started which completely consumed the car, though Ghinzani escaped with only minor burns to his hands. However, it was enough for him to be withdrawn from the race.

Brazilian Nelson Piquet qualified on pole position, with Prost 2nd. The latter, however, had to start from the pit lane due to problems with his car (Prost was able to race the spare car after ignition problem with Lauda's McLaren was solved, as the Ghinzani crash allowed McLaren extra time to fix it. If not for the crash Lauda would have had the spare and Prost would not have driven). Although the Brabhams with their highly powerful BMW turbo engines proved to be very quick on this circuit, they were very unreliable cars, mostly due to the single turbocharger of the 4 cylinder engine. In addition to Piquet retiring, his teammate Teo Fabi also retired, and Austrian Niki Lauda moved up through the field to win in his McLaren. Prost was able to carve his way from the back to 2nd place, keeping his lead in the championship. The new Brazilian driver Ayrton Senna finished 6th in the race in his Toleman under considerable back pain, scoring his first ever world championship point.

Round 3: Belgium
The Belgian Grand Prix was previously held at the revised Spa-Francorchamps circuit; for this year, however, it returned to the forested Zolder circuit further north. This race saw a fighting drive from Keke Rosberg, who was driving an ill-handling Williams with a Honda engine that was unbalancing the car. Ferrari's new Italian recruit Michele Alboreto won this race from Warwick and Frenchman Rene Arnoux, driving the second Ferrari. Both McLarens failed to finish. This would be the last time the Formula One Belgian Grand Prix was held at Zolder; from the following year onwards it would return and stay at Spa.

Round 4: San Marino (Imola, Italy)
The San Marino Grand Prix at the Autodromo Dino Ferrari in Italy was held one week after the Belgian race. Defending champion Piquet, proving yet again his Brabham's superiority on light fuel loads took pole position again. Amazingly, Senna did not qualify for the race after many problems with his uncompetitive Toleman, the only time in his F1 career in which he would fail to qualify. Piquet however retired in the race with another turbo failure, and Fabi retired on the same lap with the same problem. The race was won by Prost from his countryman Arnoux and Italian Elio de Angelis in a Renault-powered Lotus.

Round 5: France
The French Grand Prix, usually run in late June/early July was run in May at the very fast Dijon-Prenois circuit. Patrick Tambay took pole in his Renault; he finished 2nd to Niki Lauda in a McLaren that was superior to all other cars at this short circuit that was made up of long, fast corners. This would be the last time the French Grand Prix was held at the Dijon circuit; the cars were lapping in the 1 minute 2 second range during qualifying. The FIA stipulated that any lap during a Formula One event that was under a minute did not count as a completed lap.

Round 6: Monaco
The Monaco Grand Prix was the only Grand Prix in 1984 to be run in wet conditions. Qualifying saw Briton Martin Brundle crashing his Tyrrell at the Tabac corner, as his car overturned and landed on its left side. Brundle was uninjured, and took the spare car to qualify. In the race day, the circuit was flooded by rain, as never before in Monaco since the 1930s and the 1972 event. The organizers decided to cover the tunnel section with water, because of the dramatic difference between the very wet circuit and the almost completely dry "tunnel", which was in fact the road that went under the Hotel de Paris. Prost took pole position, in front of Mansell. As the drivers went away, there was an accident at the Saint-Devote corner during the start between both the Renaults of Tambay and Warwick; Tambay injured his legs (due to the design of the cars back then where the driver's feet were not required to be behind the front axle, as is the rule today) and had to be carried off the circuit on a stretcher. As the rain came down, Mansell spun his Lotus on the climb up to the Massenet corner after touching a slippery white line. Prost took the lead, although he was pacing himself in comparison to rookie drivers Ayrton Senna in a Toleman and Stefan Bellof in a naturally-aspirated Tyrrell. Senna and Bellof pushed hard in an attempt to catch Prost, who was still pacing himself in conditions that were getting worse. By lap 26 of the scheduled 80 laps, the conditions became so bad that Prost signalled to Jacky Ickx, the clerk of the course to stop the race. By lap 26, Senna was up to second place, 11 seconds behind Prost, and Bellof 4th, but on lap 29, the race was stopped. Prost parked his car on the main straight, and Senna passed him. However, the rules said that when a race was stopped, the order would be determined by what the order was on the previous lap- and Prost was leading on that lap. The race was never restarted, so Prost won with Senna second. Drivers scored half-points, as the race had not completed 75% of the scheduled distance.

Round 7: Canada
The Canadian race at the public road Gilles Villeneuve circuit on a man-made island in the St. Lawrence River's passageway through the center of Montreal was won by Nelson Piquet, who was finally able to actually finish a race this season after chronic unreliability with his Brabham. Piquet won ahead of Lauda and Prost; the latter had to deal a misfire in his TAG-Porsche turbocharged engine.

Round 8: Detroit (USA)
The first of two rounds in the United States was held on an angular street circuit in the Ford and General Motors home city of Detroit, Michigan. The race was moved 2 weeks forward to late June, suffering a considerable temperature difference. It was very hot come race-day, and the track — which was already unpopular with drivers and as it was to do in subsequent Grand Prix in Detroit — was largely broken up. Nelson Piquet took pole position again; every driver who obtained pole position that year was given a free Vespa motor scooter. Piquet set the record that year for most motor scooters collected among F1 drivers. The start of the Detroit Grand Prix saw an accident between Piquet and Mansell which blocked much of the start-finish straight; this race had to be abandoned and restarted. Typical of Detroit, the race proved to be a race of severe attrition: only 6 of the 26 cars finished.

Nelson Piquet won again on a circuit where engine power was not as important as other things, and Martin Brundle compounded this with his naturally aspirated engined Tyrrell: Detroit was one of the few circuits where his underpowered car could actually finish in the points and be competitive. Thanks to the immediate power response of the naturally aspirated Ford-Cosworth V8 DFY in the Tyrrell, compared to the delayed power response of the turbocharged engines (all of which had more than 200 more horsepower than the DFY in 1984), Brundle passed de Angelis in a Lotus for second, and was closing on Piquet on the last lap. The British driver finished 8 tenths of a second behind the Brazilian.

Round 9: Dallas (USA)
This race effectively replaced the United States Grand Prix West in Long Beach, California, which was held in April and was taken over by CART IndyCar racing. This race had already been controversial for being held in the intense 38 °C (100 °F) average heat and humidity of a Texas July summer, and there were week-long rumors of its cancellation. Although the event organization itself (headed by racing legend Carroll Shelby) was praised and Dallas's reception was thought to be welcoming and friendly, the time of year this race was scheduled made conditions extremely difficult. The concrete-wall lined circuit, located in a city district containing the Cotton Bowl some 10 kilometers outside of the center of Dallas measured what is possibly the highest track temperature ever recorded during a Grand Prix: 66 °C (151 °F). As a result, such extreme temperatures combined with the tyre and aerodynamic adhesion meant that the track almost completely disintegrated- the break up was so bad that the only parts of the track that were not covered with gravel were tire tracks left on the racing line. As a result, it was not only very slippery, but extremely bumpy as well. It was then decided to start the Grand Prix at 11:00 a.m. instead of the traditional time of 2:00 p.m. in an attempt to avoid the heat, which was scheduled to be 40 °C (104 °F) that day.

Nigel Mansell put his Lotus on pole position, the first of his career, with his teammate de Angelis alongside him in second. Martin Brundle yet again crashed severely and injured his ankles; he did not take part in the race. On race day, there was an American Trans-Am support race that left the track with huge holes in the track scattered everywhere. Shelby and the organizers were able to briefly fix these holes barely 45 minutes after the race was due to start, with Prost and Lauda leading protests to cancel the race.

As expected, the track broke up at the point that the cars had to line up behind each other even when right near each other to avoid the strewn gravel- which if the cars got on top of, they would slip and slide (with nearly the same effect as driving on ice) and most likely crash at the tight and extremely demanding Fair Park circuit. Mansell held off several challenges from Warwick, who got onto the marbles (strewn gravel) and crashed into a tire barrier- and also challenges from de Angelis, Prost, Lauda and Rosberg. Piquet was also catching this group and Arnoux, who had to start from the pit lane, passed several cars and was also closing on the leading group. Rosberg, who was running 2nd then forced Mansell into a mistake, and took the lead. Mansell had to go into the pits because of problems with his car; Prost took the lead from Rosberg, but eight laps later he clipped the wall and damaged his back right wheel. Rosberg, in his ill-handling Williams-Honda took advantage of Prost's mistake and re-passed the Frenchman. Piquet hit the wall, and then retired due to a jammed accelerator pedal. There were consistent retirements throughout the entire race (all but 2 of the retirements were either accident or punctured-tire related; made worse by the close concrete walls), with the air and track temperatures rising and the track getting even worse. Prost then retired due to a puncture, as did Michele Alboreto and Lauda. Rosberg, equipped with a skull cap that kept him cool went on to win ahead of Arnoux and de Angelis.

Only 7 of the 26 cars entered finished the race, one more finisher than Detroit. Mansell, one lap down in 6th place, suffered gearbox failure right before the finish, deciding to push his broken black Lotus across the line in the Dallas heat in his black overalls. While doing this, he collapsed and fainted due to exhaustion. He was given 6th place because the 7th and 8th-place finishers were 2 laps behind Mansell.

Formula One would return to Texas 28 years later, but to the state capital city of Austin south of Dallas at a permanent circuit in November 2012.

Race 10: Great Britain
Formula One returned to Europe after the attrition-filled North American tour. The Brands Hatch circuit, just outside London in southeastern England, played host to this year's British Grand Prix, alternating with Silverstone every two years.

During this time, the Tyrrell team had undergone a difficult period due to the fuel irregularities involving the re-filling of water tanks and the insertion of lead shot balls in the fuel tanks, in order to meet the minimum weight rules. In an unprecedented move that has not been repeated since, the FIA decided to ban the Tyrrell team from every future Grand Prix that season and strip the small English team of all its championship points on the grounds of cheating; team owner/operator Ken Tyrrell lost most of his sponsors between the Dallas and British Grands Prix.

Toleman driver and multiple motorcycle Grand Prix champion Johnny Cecotto crashed heavily at the fast Westfield corner hitting the barriers there head-on; the Venezuelan broke both his legs and never raced in Formula One again. Piquet again qualified on pole position, with Prost and Lauda 2nd and 3rd. This race was run as two parts: the first race saw a massive accident at the Bottom Bend left hand sweeping corner (otherwise known as Graham Hill corner); Riccardo Patrese (Alfa Romeo) tried to pass Jacques Laffite's Williams-Honda, but spun attempting to do so. This caused his teammate Eddie Cheever to lift off, and behind him Johansson did the same but Philippe Alliot in the RAM-Hart did not have time to react and went into the back of the Tyrrell and then flew over it, landing on the rear of Cheever's car. Also involved was Gartner who tried to avoid the crash and ended up in the tire barrier. The race went on, with Prost passing Piquet at the fearsome Paddock Hill bend; but this ended up not mattering because before the end of the lap, Jonathan Palmer had crashed the second RAM heavily at Clearways when the suspension failed. The car was parked beside the track and it was then decided that if it was left there, it could become a launch pad if another car went off the circuit. The race was stopped, and this meant that at the restart Piquet was on pole again as the order was based on the end of the 11th lap- much to the annoyance of Prost.

After the race restarted, Prost retired with gearbox failure, Piquet pitted and lost a lap on the leaders. So victory went to Niki Lauda. Warwick finished 2nd and Ayrton Senna finished 3rd in the Toleman, which was better suited to faster tracks with long corners like Brands Hatch than it was to slow and tight circuits.

Race 11: Germany
The very fast Hockenheim circuit in West Germany- the longest circuit of the year once again played host to the historic German Grand Prix. Surprisingly at this power circuit, Prost qualified his McLaren on pole position showing the benefits of a good car set up, and took the race victory ahead of Lauda and Warwick. Piquet retired yet again- this time with gearbox problems. The first part of the race saw a stirring drive from Senna- he was as high as 6th in his uncompetitive Toleman- but then his car's rear wing failed and he spun off near the Ostkurve chicane.

Race 12: Austria
The Austrian Grand Prix, held at the Österreichring at Zeltweg near Graz since 1970, played host to the 15th Austrian Grand Prix and the 400th Formula One Grand Prix. The Österreichring was the fastest circuit of the year (this was the case when Silverstone was not on the calendar). Pole-sitter Piquet took the lead and led for most of the race distance. After the Renault engine in Elio de Angelis's Lotus failed and littered the racing line at the very fast Jochen Rindt Kurve with slippery oil, the leaders Piquet and Prost came through- Piquet slipped and slid slightly through the corner- but Prost, while trying to hold 4th gear in place spun his car and crashed into the track-side Armco barrier. Lauda, who had passed 3rd placed Patrick Tambay coming out of the Bosch Kurve moved up into 2nd, and then began chasing Piquet; Lauda passed him going into the fastest corner on the track, the Tiroch Kurve. Piquet dropped back with ruined tires, and Lauda slowed down a lot after losing 4th gear in the Texaco Panorama curves. Lauda was able to stay in front of Piquet and become the only Austrian to win his home Grand Prix. Italian Michele Alboreto in a Ferrari finished 3rd.

Race 13: Netherlands
The spectacular beach-side Zandvoort circuit half an hour west of Amsterdam was the traditionally long-time host of the Dutch Grand Prix. This race was a McLaren 1–2 with Prost winning in front of Lauda with the Lotus duo Mansell and de Angelis finishing 3rd and 4th, respectively. It was at this race where McLaren secured the Manufacturers' Championship. The result also saw that only de Angelis had a mathematical chance of beating either Lauda or Prost to the Drivers' Championship.

Race 14: Italy
The Italian Grand Prix took place in early September at the Monza Autodrome near Milan. This race saw Prost retire after an updated spec. TAG-Porsche engine in his car failed early. Lauda, who was suffering the effects of a sore back, won from Italians Michele Alboreto and Riccardo Patrese who inherited the third place when his teammate Eddie Cheever ran out of fuel in his Alfa Romeo. This would prove to be the last F1 podium achieved by Alfa Romeo. Nelson Piquet led early before retiring with engine failure, while teammate Teo Fabi then led until he retired, also with a failed BMW engine. Patrick Tambay then took over the lead until he was passed by Lauda with the Renault retiring shortly after. Swedish driver Stefan Johansson stepped in to drive the Toleman of Ayrton Senna for this race after Toleman has suspended the Brazilian when it became known that he had signed to drive for Lotus from 1985. Johansson drove a steady race and capitalising on the retirements of others finished fourth, scoring his first World Championship points. Austrian drivers Jo Gartner and Gerhard Berger finished 5th and 6th for Osella and ATS respectively; however, as their teams had only entered one car for the season and both were in second cars entered for the race neither received World Championship points.

Race 15: Europe (Germany)
Grands Prix in the Queens neighborhood of New York City and in the beachside resort town of Fuengirola, Spain had been cancelled; which left a month-long gap between the Italian and a replacement Grand Prix: the European Grand Prix, this year held at the all-new Nürburgring Grand Prix circuit,  with state of the art safety facilities and paddock terraces. This new circuit replaced the old 22.8 km  Nordschleife, which still exists today but in slightly shortened and bypassed form from the GP circuit.

As the race went on, there was an accident at the start involving Senna and Rosberg; both were out at the first corner; and Prost won this race unchallenged from Alboreto, pole-sitter Piquet and Lauda, who qualified 15th. This meant that Prost's victory meant that he still stood a chance to win his first Drivers' Championship; Lauda led the points tally with 3.5 points.

Race 16: Portugal
The first Portuguese Grand Prix since 1960 was held at the updated Estoril circuit near the Portuguese capital of Lisbon.  McLaren had claimed the Constructors' Championship in Italy, after winning 11 of the 15 races in the season,  including the last 6 Grands Prix. Prost qualified 2nd alongside Piquet,  who collected his 9th pole of the season, while Lauda was 11th on the grid.  Lauda climbed up to 3rd after passing Ayrton Senna, who  had qualified 3rd in a Toleman. Piquet had fallen away, so Prost was leading, with Nigel Mansell second in his last race for Lotus before moving to Williams.  Mansell retired due to persistent brake problems, and Lauda moved up to second, ensuring his third World Championship. Prost won McLaren's 7th consecutive victory and 12th of 16 races, whilst Lauda finished second, a mere half point in front of Prost in the championship, a record margin that has not been matched since. Senna completed the podium. As of 1984, Prost (future winner of four World Championships) had lost his 3rd consecutive F1 championship: he had been beaten by 2 points in 1983, and 7 points in 1982.

Results and standings

Grands Prix

 Half points awarded after race was stopped due to dangerous conditions.

Calendar changes
The Spanish Grand Prix was scheduled to return after a 3 year absence but moved from Jarama to a new circuit in the beach resort town Fuengirola in the Costa Del Sol just outside Malaga but was cancelled and replaced by the Portuguese Grand Prix 
For the second year in a row the New York Grand Prix was cancelled and replaced by the Hungarian Grand Prix at the Népliget Park Circuit.
However the Hungarian Grand Prix to be held on 7 October was then also cancelled as plans for a race failed to materialise. The race was replaced by the European Grand Prix this time at the Nürburgring.
The United States Grand Prix West was removed from the Championship.
The Dallas Grand Prix was the new race but would only be in the Formula 1 calendar for one season.
The South African Grand Prix was moved from the final round to become the second round.

World Drivers' Championship standings

Points towards the 1984 Formula 1 World Championship for Drivers were awarded on a 9–6–4–3–2–1 basis to the first six finishers in each race.

Notes
 Half points were awarded at the Monaco Grand Prix as less than 75% of the scheduled distance was completed.
* Neither Gartner nor Berger were eligible for points, as they were driving the respective "second entries" of Osella and ATS and both teams had officially entered only one car for the entire championship.

World Constructors' Championship standings

Points towards the 1984 Formula 1 World Championship for Manufacturers were awarded on a 9–6–4–3–2–1 basis to the first six finishers in each race.

 On 18 July, prior to the British Grand Prix, Tyrrell were disqualified from the championship due to a technical infringement, which had been discovered at the Detroit Grand Prix. They continued racing under appeal but were ineligible to score points towards the championship. On 29 August, the FIA rejected the team's appeal and banned them from the final three races of the season. The 13 points they had scored prior to the disqualification were subsequently reallocated.
 Half points were awarded at the Monaco Grand Prix as less than 75% of the scheduled distance was completed.

References

External links 

1984 Formula 1 review
1984 Formula 1 World Championship results and images from f1-facts.com

 
Formula One seasons